Lincoln Township is one of eleven townships in Atchison County, Missouri, United States. As of the 2010 census, its population was 378.

Lincoln Township was established in 1871, and named after Abraham Lincoln, 16th President of the United States.

Geography
It contains three cemeteries: Center Grove, Long Branch, and Walden Grove.

The streams of Long Branch, Mill Creek and Squaw Creek run through this township.

References

 USGS Geographic Names Information System (GNIS)

External links
 US-Counties.com
 City-Data.com

Townships in Atchison County, Missouri
Townships in Missouri
1871 establishments in Missouri